The Midwest Buddhist Temple Ginza Holiday Festival is a large annual Japanese cultural festival that occurs on the second weekend, Friday to Sunday, of August at 435 W. Menomonee Street in Chicago’s historic Old Town, Chicago. The Midwest Buddhist Temple has kept this annual event going since 1955, except 2020 when it was cancelled and a virtual event was conducted because of the COVID-19 pandemic.

Highlighting the event are four master craftsmen (Waza), flown in straight from Tokyo, Japan. For the three days, they demonstrate their generations-old skills creating their unique crafts. The public have the opportunity to meet the Waza and purchase their crafts. Several other exhibits and booths feature other Japanese items, such as Japanese dry goods and snacks, kimono, jewelry, art and an abundance of traditional Japanese cuisine, including their famous grilled Chicken Teriyaki dinner, Udon (Japanese cold noodles), spam musubi, sushi, Edamame, and kintoki (Japanese snow cone topped with sweet azuki beans). Beer, sake and wine are also available.

Also, featured in the festival are ongoing stage performances with Taiko drumming, Traditional Japanese folk dances, martial arts demonstrations, and other entertainment and exhibits.

The temple is open for guests who are interested in observing the service area and learning the basics of Buddhism. During stage intermissions, there are short Dharma talks given inside the Temple by Rev. Ron Miyamura.

References
Midwest Buddhist Temple
Midwest Buddhist Temple Ginza Holiday Festival

Festivals in Chicago